What's Bred in the Bone is the second novel in the Canadian writer Robertson Davies' Cornish Trilogy. It is the life story of Francis or Frank Cornish, whose death and will were the starting point for the first novel, The Rebel Angels.

Plot

After a brief framing scene among characters from The Rebel Angels, the novel turns to a conversation between the Recording Angel and the daimon in charge of Cornish's life. The main part of the book is that life as narrated by the Recording Angel, interspersed with comments in which the daimon explains how he worked to make Cornish a great man.

We follow Cornish's life from his two Canadian grandparents – part of "what's bred in the bone" – through his childhood as a wealthy and precocious misfit in a small Ontario town, his education in Toronto and Oxford, his unusual apprenticeship as a restorer and painter in Nazi Germany, his wartime experiences in England, his postwar work with a group resembling the Monuments Men, and his collecting and patronage of the arts in Toronto.  A repeated theme in his mature years is art forgery.

Cornish's daimon believes that people develop through adversity and provides Cornish with plenty, most obviously at the hands of his childhood classmates and his artistic master in Germany, but also in two love affairs and in a friendship with a young man who in some ways is Cornish's apprentice. Another form of adversity is Cornish's situation as a talented artist whose interests and skills are out of fashion.

First published by Macmillan of Canada in 1985, What's Bred in the Bone was on the shortlist for the 1986 Booker Prize.

What's Bred in the Bone is the second novel of the Cornish Trilogy. It was followed by The Lyre of Orpheus.  It is also connected to earlier novels; when Cornish is at school in Toronto, one of his teachers is Dunstan Ramsay from the Deptford Trilogy. There are many parallels to be found in W. Somerset Maugham's Of Human Bondage.

External links 
 

1985 Canadian novels
Novels by Robertson Davies
Novels about artists
Macmillan Publishers books